Kamil Ozerk (born 8 October 1954 in Cyprus) is a Norwegian-Turkish Cypriot educator and professor of pedagogy at the University of Oslo.

Publications
Ozerk's published works include:

English
Curtin, Alicia; Cahill, Kevin; O`Sullivan, Dan & Øzerk, Kamil (2020). Assessment in Practice: Explorations in Identity, Culture, Policy and Inclusion. Routledge.  .  166 s. 
Øzerk, Kamil (2020). Prevalence of Autism/ASD Among Preschool and School-age Children in Norway. Contemporary School Psychology.  .  24, s 419- 428 .  Fulltekst i vitenarkiv. 
Øzerk, Kamil & Ringereide, Hans Otto (2019). A New Approach to Vocational Teacher Training -A Norwegian Innovative Experience. Journal of Education and Human Development (New York).  .  8(1), s 18- 28
Øzerk, Meral & Øzerk, Kamil (2019). Multicultural Settings and School Psychological Services—a Norwegian Experience with Developing Competency in Multicultural Counseling. Contemporary School Psychology.  .  24, s 349- 361
Henriksen, Marit Breie; Eira, Karen Inga; Keskitalo, Jan Henry & Øzerk, Kamil (2018). Nasjonale prøver i lesing på samisk - på hvilke premisser?. Acta Didactica Norge.  .  12(4), s 1- 20
Øzerk, Kamil (2018). Prevalence of Autism/ASD in the Capital City of Oslo, Norway. International Electronic Journal of Elementary Education. .  11(1), s 23- 30
Øzerk, Kamil (2016). The issue of prevalence of autism/ASD. International Electronic Journal of Elementary Education. .  9(2), s 263- 306
.
.
.
.
.

Norwegian
Øzerk, Kamil & Øzerk, Meral (2020). Autisme og pedagogikk - en teoretisk og metodisk håndbok. Cappelen Damm Akademisk.  .  472 s.
Øzerk, Kamil; Vea, Gunvor Dalby; Eikeseth, Svein & Øzerk, Meral R. (2016). Ole Ivar Lovaas - His life, Merits and Legacy. International Electronic Journal of Elementary Education.  .  9(2), s 243- 262
Øzerk, Kamil (2016). Tospråklig oppvekst og læring. Cappelen Damm Akademisk.  .  234 s
Øzerk, Kamil (2011). PEDAGOGIKKENS HVORDAN NR 2. Cappelen Damm AS.  .  215 s. 
Øzerk, Kamil (2010). NEIS-modellen. Oplandske Bokforlag.  .  173 s. 
Øzerk, Kamil (2010). PEDAGOGIKKENS HVORDAN NR 1. Cappelen Damm Akademisk.  .  151 s. 
Todal, Jon & Øzerk, Kamil (2013). Written Language Shift among Norwegian Youth. International Electronic Journal of Elementary Education.  .  5(3), s 285- 300 
Øzerk, Kamil (2006). Fra språkbad til språkdrukning - modeller for opplæring med to språk. Oplandske Bokforlag.  .  136 s. 
.
Øzerk, Kamil (2006). Opplæringsteori og læreplanforståelse : en lærebok med vekt på Kunnskapsløftet, Rammeplan for barnehager og aktuelle kunnskaper for pedagoger. Oplandske Bokforlag.  .  409 s.

Personal life
He is married to Meral R. Ozerk who is a senior advisor at Statped, specializing in children with learning disabilities. Together with his wife, they have written children's books in the field of education, bilingualism and autism. Their son, Ozan Ozerk, is a multi-millionaire medical doctor and entrepreneur who co-founded the Norwegian social-networking site Biip.no.

References

External links
Kamil Øzerk: The University of Oslo website

1954 births
Living people
Turkish Cypriot emigrants to Norway
Norwegian people of Turkish Cypriot descent 
Academic staff of the University of Oslo
University of Oslo alumni
Norwegian academics
21st-century educational theorists
Academic staff of the Sámi University of Applied Sciences
20th-century educational theorists